The Six Days of Bassano del Grappa was a six-day track cycling race held annually in Bassano del Grappa, Italy.

Winners

References

Cycle races in Italy
Six-day races
Recurring sporting events established in 1986
Recurring sporting events disestablished in 1998
1986 establishments in Italy
1998 disestablishments in Italy
Defunct cycling races in Italy